Fireworld is a French company that markets "Invisible PC spy software" based on browser history and Facebook profile. It received international attention after the launch of software that allows parents to spy on their children to discover their sexual orientation.

History 
The company received international media attention, including Gay Times and BBC News, Léa Marie translated the advertisement for Konbini: "How to be certain my son is gay. While most children are heterosexual, that's not the case for everyone, and while some are loud and proud about their homosexuality, some prefer to remain  discreet. This article will help you determine  whether or not your son is gay." French Secretary of State for Equality Marlène Schiappa retweeted a post by L'Amicale des Jeunes du Refuge's, commenting that it showed that "homophobia and sexism have their roots in the same gender stereotypes. We will fight them together". Other "warning signs" listed by the company were: Taking good care of himself, preferring reading and the theater to sports, shyness, piercings and liking female singers and divas. Using software to spy on your child and to hack into his or her Facebook account is illegal under French law. A blog post from the company about the software states: "Family is fundamental... That’s why the sexual orientation of your children, directly responsible for the continuation of your family, is very important to you."

References

External links 
 Fireworld (English)
 Fireworld (French)

LGBT in France
Software companies of France